Diogo Afonso (fl. 15th century) was a Portuguese explorer.

Biography
He took part in several explorations in the northwest and west coast of Africa which were made by Prince Henry.

In 1444, he commanded a ship which had other explorers including Antão Gonçalves and Gomes Pires and explored the Rio de Oro (most of the areas that are now belong to Mauritania).  In his second year, he took park in an expedition in the island of Arguin (now in Mauritania) with Antão Gonçalves and Garcia Homem.  His ship passed by a frontier coast of the island, discovered its cape, in that region had a large number of captives, which were returned to Lisbon, where they were sold.  Prince Henry. brought a fifth expedition which included Duarte Pacheco Pereira.  He later explored the remainder of the Cape Verdean islands mainly in the northwestern part.

On a royal map of Alphonso V dated in September 29, 1462, the king brought it for Infante Don Fernando, his brother, of an island "Northwest of the Canary Islands and Madeira", it said:
  Secondly on the same map, Diogo Afonso discovered five islands more west in Cape Verde including Brava, São Nicolau, São Vicente and Santo Antão and the islets of Branco and Razo.

Diogo Afonso later settled in the island of Santiago and inhabited Ribeira Grande and was one of the first settlers of the island, there on January 29, 1462,  he became the first of two captains of the island of Santiago which was governed in the then colonial capital of Ribeira Grande, he remained captain until 1473, from September 19, 1462, as captain of Southern Santiago which he was succeeded by his brother or son Rodrigo Afonso.  The remainder of his life is unknown.

Legacy
A statue is erected at the shores of its beach in Mindelo in the historic city center in the island of São Vicente, an island that he discovered, it is located west of Avenida Marginal, also a street is named after him further east, it is located a street east of Rua João Cleofas Martins, it intersects one street named Rua Camões named after the greatest Portuguese poet, the only one named in Barlavento.

See also
List of colonial governors of Cape Verde, including its predecessor the Captains of Santiago Island

References

Further reading
 Albuquerque Luís, Dicionário de história dos descobrimentos Portugueses (Dictionary of History of Portuguese Discoveries), Lisbon, Círculo de Leitores
 Serrão, Joel (1963), "Afonso Diogo", Dicionàrio de História de Portugal''' (Dictionary of the History of Portugal), 1st ed, Torres, Ruy d'Abreu, Lisbon, Iniciativas Editoriais. p. 49
 François Angelier, Dictionnaire des Voyageurs et Explorateurs occidentaux (Dictionary of Western Voyages and Explorers''), Pygmalion, 2011, p. 30

Portuguese colonial governors and administrators
Portuguese explorers
15th-century Portuguese people